The Uttarakhand Legislative Assembly, also known as the Uttarakhand Vidhan Sabha, is a unicameral governing and law making body of Uttarakhand, one of the 28 states of India. It is seated at Dehradun, the winter capital, and Gairsain, the summer capital of Uttarakhand. The total strength of the assembly is 70 Members of the Legislative Assembly (MLA).

Seats
Between 2002 and 2020, Uttarakhand Legislative Assembly had 71 seats, including one reserved seat for the member of Anglo-Indian community that was abolished on 25 January 2020 by the 104th Constitutional Amendment Act, 2019, reducing the strength of Assembly from 71 to 70 seats.

2016 Assembly suspension 

In March 2016, capping a nine-day high-voltage political drama, the Bharatiya Janata Party-led Union Government brought Uttarakhand under President's rule citing a constitutional breakdown in the wake of a rebellion in then state-ruling Indian National Congress, which slammed the decision calling it a "murder of democracy" and a "black day".

President Pranab Mukherjee signed the proclamation under Article 356 of the Constitution of India dismissing the INC-ruled State Government, the Chief Minister Harish Rawat and placing the Assembly under suspended animation on the recommendation of the Union Cabinet.

The Union Government was of the view that continuance of the Rawat government was "immoral and unconstitutional" after 18 March 2016, when the Uttarakhand Assembly Speaker declared the appropriation bill "passed" in controversial circumstances without allowing a division pressed for by 35 MLAs, including 9 rebel Congress legislators.

The Union Cabinet had held an emergency meeting on Saturday night presided over by Prime Minister Narendra Modi, who had cut short a visit to Assam to return to the New Delhi for the purpose.

The Cabinet considered several reports received from Governor Krishan Kant Paul, who had described the political situation as volatile and expressed apprehensions over possible pandemonium during the scheduled trial of strength in the Assembly on Monday.

The purported CD of the sting operation conducted against the Chief Minister that was in public domain on Saturday was understood to have been factored into the decision of the Cabinet which found it as a case of horse trading.

Additionally Two Uttarakhand MLAs, one each from Indian National Congress and Bharatiya Janata Party were on 9 June suspended for cross-voting during the floor test that was held on 10 May. Speaker Govind Singh Kunjwal suspended BJP MLA Bhim Lal Arya and INC MLA Rekha Arya.

Electionwise Composition of Assembly

List of Assemblies

The following is the list of all the Uttarakhand Legislative Assemblies

Speakers

Notes
  In the 2012 Assembly election, Uttarakhand Kranti Dal contested as "Uttarakhand Kranti Dal (P)" led by then party president Trivendra Singh Panwar. The original party name and the election symbol (chair) was frozen by the Election Commission of India following the factionism and leadership dispute within the party that led to its break-up. Its original name and party symbol were restored in 2017.

References

External links
 Uttarakhand Lok Sabha Election 2019 Result Website
 Elected Members of Legislative Assembly of Uttarakhand, Official list Govt. of Uttarakhand.
 Members of Uttarakhand Legislative Assembly
 Uttarakhand Legislative Assembly
 President’s rule in Uttarakhand; Congress says ‘murder of democracy’

 

 
Politics of Uttarakhand 
Government of Uttarakhand
Unicameral legislatures
2002 establishments in Uttarakhand